David Perkowski (born July 23, 1947) is an American former competition swimmer.

Raised in Westfield, New Jersey, Perkowski graduated in 1965 from Westfield High School, where he won six individual state titles.

Perkowski represented the United States at the 1968 Summer Olympics in Mexico City.  He competed in the semifinals of the men's 100-meter breaststroke and finished third in his heat with a time of 1:09.0.

Perkowski attended Indiana University in Bloomington, Indiana, where he swam for coach Doc Counsilman's Indiana Hoosiers swimming and diving team in National Collegiate Athletic Association (NCAA) competition from 1967 to 1969.  He was a four-time All-American, and was a key contributor to the Hoosiers' NCAA national team championships in 1968 and 1969.

References

1947 births
Living people
American male breaststroke swimmers
Indiana Hoosiers men's swimmers
Olympic swimmers of the United States
People from Westfield, New Jersey
Sportspeople from New York City
Sportspeople from Union County, New Jersey
Swimmers at the 1968 Summer Olympics
Swimmers from New Jersey
Westfield High School (New Jersey) alumni